Lancaster is an unincorporated community in Wabash County, Illinois, United States.  Lancaster is located 9 miles west of Allendale and 12 miles northwest of Mt. Carmel.

References

Unincorporated communities in Wabash County, Illinois
Unincorporated communities in Illinois